Kahnuk Rural District is a rural district (dehestan) in Irandegan District, Khash County, Sistan and Baluchestan province, Iran. At the 2006 census, its population was 8,200, in 1,898 families.  The rural district has 105 villages. At the 2016 census, its population was 8,502.

References 

Khash County
Rural Districts of Sistan and Baluchestan Province
Populated places in Khash County